Didier Codorniou (born 13 February 1958 in Narbonne) is a former French rugby union player and a French politician. He played as a Centre.

Codorniou played for RC Narbonne and Stade Toulousain. He earned his first national cap on 7 July 1979 against the All Blacks, in the first victory France had achieved over the New Zealand team in New Zealand.

In Path to Victory former Australian flyhalf Mark Ella wrote of Codorniou that, "After playing against Didier Codorniou, I thought he was the best centre in the world. He directed all the backline traffic. He had the ball skills to set the play up or be an electrifying individualist."

Honours 
 Grand Slam : 1981
 French rugby champion, 1979 with RC Narbonne and 1989 with Stade Toulousain.
 Challenge Yves du Manoir 1978, 1979 and 1984 with RC Narbonne

Notes

References

 

1958 births
Living people
French rugby union players
Stade Toulousain players
Rugby union centres
France international rugby union players
Knights of the Ordre du Mérite Maritime
Officers of the Ordre national du Mérite